Baldwin Airport  is a registered aerodrome located  east of Baldwin, Ontario, Canada.

Baldwin Airport is home to the Parachute School of Toronto, which is the only skydiving club in Ontario that runs year round.

See also
Baldwin West Aerodrome

References

External links
Official site
Page about this airport on COPA's Places to Fly airport directory
Parachute School Of Toronto

Registered aerodromes in Ontario